Wussy, the third full-length album by the band of the same name, was released in May 2009. The label, Shake It Records, released the album in CD format only.

The album received mostly positive reviews, with NPR's Ken Tucker describing it as "a concept album propelled forward by the band's buzz saw guitar riffs and tight little rhythm section." On October 1, 2009, "Happiness Bleeds" was named the NPR song of the day.

Track listing
"Little Paper Birds" – 3:43
"Gone Missing" – 3:30
"Happiness Bleeds" – 3:22
"Muscle Cars" – 4:49
"Scream and Scream Again" – 3:14
"All the Bugs are Growing" – 3:19
"Dreadful Sorry" – 3:34
"Magic Words" – 3:22
"This Will Not End Well" – 3:21
"Maglite" – 2:28
"Death by Misadventure" – 3:48
"Las Vegas" – 3:49

References

2008 albums
Wussy albums